Maxwell Creek is a stream in the municipality of Georgian Bluffs, Grey County in Southwestern Ontario, Canada. It is in geographic Derby Township, is part of the Great Lakes Basin and is a right tributary of the Pottawatomi River.

The Pottawatomi River flows to Georgian Bay on Lake Huron.

References

Rivers of Grey County